Sukhoy Rakit is a rural locality (a selo) in Blagoveshchensky District, Altai Krai, Russia. The population was 60 as of 2016. There are 2 streets.

Geography 
Sukhoy Rakit is located 16 km northeast of Blagoveshchenka (the district's administrative centre) by road. Nikolayevka is the nearest rural locality.

Ethnicity 
The village is inhabited by Russians and others.

References 

Rural localities in Blagoveshchensky District, Altai Krai